In mathematics, a polynomial sequence is a sequence of polynomials indexed by the nonnegative integers 0, 1, 2, 3, ..., in which each index is equal to the degree of the corresponding polynomial.  Polynomial sequences are a topic of interest in enumerative combinatorics and algebraic combinatorics, as well as applied mathematics.

Examples

Some polynomial sequences arise in physics and approximation theory as the solutions of certain ordinary differential equations:
 Laguerre polynomials
 Chebyshev polynomials
 Legendre polynomials
 Jacobi polynomials

Others come from statistics:
 Hermite polynomials

Many are studied in algebra and combinatorics:
 Monomials
 Rising factorials
 Falling factorials
 All-one polynomials
 Abel polynomials
 Bell polynomials
 Bernoulli polynomials
 Cyclotomic polynomials
 Dickson polynomials
 Fibonacci polynomials
 Lagrange polynomials
 Lucas polynomials
 Spread polynomials
 Touchard polynomials
 Rook polynomials

Classes of polynomial sequences
 Polynomial sequences of binomial type
 Orthogonal polynomials
 Secondary polynomials
 Sheffer sequence
 Sturm sequence
 Generalized Appell polynomials

See also
Umbral calculus

References
 Aigner, Martin. "A course in enumeration",  GTM Springer, 2007,   p21.
 Roman, Steven "The Umbral Calculus", Dover Publications, 2005, .
 Williamson, S. Gill "Combinatorics for Computer Science", Dover Publications, (2002) p177.

Polynomials
Sequences and series